Adjara State Museum is a museum in the city of Batumi in  Adjara, Georgia.

See also
 List of museums in Georgia (country)

Museums in Batumi